The  of Japan was the nine-person national security council which advises the prime minister on national security and the military and deals with a wide spectrum of issues which indirectly affect Japan's broader interests, including basic national defense policy, the National Defense Program Outline, the outline on coordinating industrial production and other matters related to the National Defense Program Outline, including decisions on diplomatic initiatives and defense operations.

History
It was created on July 1, 1986 to replace its predecessor, the National Defense Council, during Yasuhiro Nakasone's term as prime minister. The NDC acted as an advisory group on defense-related matters since 1956 and was plagued with shortcomings on managing daily defense issues and doing crisis management. Like the NDC, the SC had problems with its mandate, structure, secretariat and functions, but it was considered an improvement for its ability to coordinate with parts of the Japanese governments by conducting half a dozen meetings frequently.

It was superseded by the Japanese National Security Council set up by Shinzo Abe in January 2014.

Membership
The Security Council was presided over by the Prime Minister and includes the Ministers of State who were specified in advance under Article 9 of the Cabinet Law; the Foreign Minister, the Finance Minister, the Chief Cabinet Secretary, the Minister for Defense, the Chairman of the National Public Safety Commission, and the Director General of the Economic Planning Agency.

The Chairman of the Security Council may invite the Chairman of the Joint Staff Council or another relevant State Minister or Official to attend meetings.

References

Cabinet of Japan
Japan
1986 establishments in Japan
Defunct government agencies of Japan
2014 disestablishments in Japan